A false lien is document that purports to describe a lien, but which has no legal basis, or which is based upon false, fictitious, or fraudulent statements or representations. In the United States, the filing of false liens has been used as a tool of harassment in "paper terrorism", often against government officials. The practice was pioneered by the Posse Comitatus. The Bureau of Prisons has responded by treating lien documents and personal information (such as Social Security Numbers) of federal agents, judges, etc. as contraband in federal prisons.

The U.S. Congress has criminalized the filing of false liens, and the U.S. Sentencing Guidelines treat the filing of a false lien against a government official as equally serious as threatening the government officials of the United States. Various U.S. states have been developing ways of combating false liens.

References

Crime
Liens